Chung-Ang University (CAU) is a private research university in Seoul, South Korea. It is widely regarded as one of the best universities in South Korea. The university operates two campuses: main campus located in Dongjak District, Seoul, and an additional campus in Anseong, Gyeonggi Province. CAU consists of 16 undergraduate colleges and 16 graduate schools.

Starting as a church-run kindergarten in 1916, CAU transformed into a school for female kindergarten teachers in 1922 and was granted university status in 1953. The university held its centennial in 2018. It has 33,600 undergraduates, 5,200 graduates, 700 professors and 500 more part-time teaching staff.
Established in 1918, CAU has endured through the painful course of Korea's modern history, upholding its ideal of "Truth and Justice".

The symbol of Central University is Blue Dragon. The blue dragon statue represents the dragon to the universe toward the outer world by ascending and ascending the earth with the dragon blessed. Blue Dragon, a symbol of divine, majestic and prosperous, represents the sacredness, authority and freedom of the university and means the eternal prosperity of Chung Ang University. In addition, each part of the Blue Dragon Prize is a source of greatness, exploration of truth, class polishing, school development and prosperity of space exploration.

History

Establishment 1918–1932
Chung-Ang University began with the establishment of Chung-Ang Kindergarten as an annex to the Chung-Ang Methodist Church located in Insa-dong, Jongno-gu, Seoul, in April 1918.

Chung-Ang Kindergarten originated as a branch of Jungdong Church in 1916 and separated in 1918.

In 1922, the Japanese enacted legislation against kindergartens to restrict expansion, however, other kindergartens including Susong, Kyungsung and Taewha, and kindergartens in Gaesung and Pyongyang were founded by 1924.

Adversity 1933–1945
The social conventions in the 1920s made it difficult to recruit female students but a Teacher Training Program was established and kindergarten teachers were educated, which can be seen as a development in the modern history of teaching in Korea. Undeterred by the hostile conditions, graduates were posted to kindergartens in cities including Hamhung, Hweryung, Busan, Masan, Jeonju, Anak, Cheonan, Sariwon, and Milyang. Thus, the Chung-Ang Kindergarten Teacher Training Program took on the role of a Professional Educational Institution.

By 1922, the Chung-Ang Teacher Training Program, in partnership with the Community Education Movement of various Japanese-Resistance organizations, was promoted to a Kindergarten Teacher Training School. Although its legal status was registered as a miscellaneous school, its standing in social perception was considered equivalent to that of a professional school with a 3-year degree course.

The reformed Chung-Ang Teacher Training School continued to face obstacles in management. With ten students, the school was forced to relocate to a private residence in 1932 due to financial and personal circumstances of the management.

In 1933, Louise Yim (Im Young-Shin) took over the helm and was appointed as the principal at the age of 34. She was a graduate of Kijeon School for Women and was previously imprisoned for 6 months for leading the Samil Independence Movement at Jeonju. She later graduated from Kwangdoo High School in Japan and was further awarded her M.A in the United States. She infamously sent pictures of the Japanese massacring Koreans during the Gwandong earthquake to Dr. Syngman Rhee, who was operating the Korean Independence Movement in the US.

After nine years in U.S., she returned to Korea in January 1932 and was determined to devote herself to the nation, which was still under Japanese rule. As she toured the country for her first role as the director of the YWCA, she realized that she needed to start with education to save the people.

Her savings of 30,000 dollars earned from farming, truck driving, and vegetable wholesale operation in U.S. was used to purchase a site at Heukseok-dong on which to build a school and took leadership of Chung-Ang Teacher Training School. Through Yim, Chung-Ang began to envisage its development as the cradle of national education.

Despite its relocation to Heukseok-dong, Chung-Ang Teacher Training School lacked facilities. So Yim rented Pearson Bible School to hold classes. However, there was a limit to Yim's personal finances and with the Japanese prohibiting contributions, the development of the School continued to face financial difficulties.

Believing that the only solution was to raise funds from U.S., Dr. Yim worked to promote donations in the U.S. As a result, she was able to return home having established the Pfeiffer Foundation in U.S. to financially support Chung-Ang Teacher Training School.

With this, the first stone building was erected on the grounds of Heukseok-dong in April 1937, to become Young-Shin Hall upon its completion in May 1938, which forms the heart of Chung-Ang today.

Students subsequently founded Chosun Kindergarten Education Society and took charge of the social education plan through concerts, plays and literary activities.

In 1937, the Japanese waged war against China, and in 1941 attacked Pearl Harbor, signalling the start of the Pacific War with the U.S. declaring war against Japan. Chung-Ang Teacher Training School was heavily targeted in view of the fact that Yim was educated in U.S. and a devout Christian.

The Communications Unit of the Japanese Army attempted to take possession of the school, but their efforts were blocked by the strong resistance of Yim. By the end of WW2, under pressure from the Japanese forces, the school was no longer able to admit new students, and the school was closed in 1944.

Construction and development of a comprehensive university 1946–1955
As Japan was defeated and Korea liberated, Dr. Yim reopened the doors to Chung-Ang Teacher Training School on 28 September 1945, and established the school motto, "Live in Truth, Live for Justice".

On 1 October of the same year, Chung-Ang Teacher Training School was re-organised under the name of Chung-Ang Professional School for Women and followed by the Admissions Ceremony. The Foundation, Chung-Ang Culture Institute, was established in November 1946, and its legal registration was completed by the following year.

In April 1947, the school was again reorganised into Chung-Ang College for Women, and then to Chung-Ang College in May 1948, establishing itself as a co-educational institution.

Whilst Dr. Yim served as a national diplomat in the United Nations, obtaining their endorsement to build a new Korea, she also continued her efforts in developing the school and was appointed dean and chairman of the board.

Although the college celebrated its first conferment of a bachelor's degree in May 1950, it was again indefinitely closed due to the outbreak of the June 25 Korean War. Students were re-admitted subsequent to the September 28 reclaim of the Country, but soon the school had to flee to Busan and set up a temporary office there in the event of January 4 Retreat of Korea's allied forces.

Upon Dr. Yim's return to the country in April 1951 after completing her diplomatic duties in U.S., the school started to give lectures in Song-do, Busan. Later, it installed branch campuses and lectures in Iri and Seoul.

Chung-Ang College continued to provide education during the war times. As a result, the second, third and fourth bachelor's degree Conferment were held during the war years in Busan, in 1951, 1952 and 1953.

The school continued to provide education during the evacuation to Busan and was recognised as a comprehensive university in February 1953. Thus, with nine departments under four component faculties including the College of Liberal Arts & Science, College of Law, College of Business, and College of Pharmacy, and a Graduate School, Dr. Yim was appointed as chancellor of the university.

The teaching faculty returned from Busan to its original site in Heukseok-dong, Seoul, in August, following the declaration of ceasefire in the Korean War in July of the same year. However, lectures had to be taught in temporary buildings as the site was still occupied by the U.S. Army. The site was eventually recovered after one semester in April 1954, and the area reorganised for the development of the university.

The university continued to expand to the scale of 19 departments under four faculties, and a population of 2,850, between 1955 and 1959.

To accommodate the increase in departments and students, a four-storey building, Pfeiffer Hall, was constructed across approximately 2,500 pyeong (1 pyeong =3.1m2) in 1956, and Chung-Ang Library constructed across approximately 3,800 pyeong in 1959.

Concurrently, International Culture Research Institute was established to enhance research activities.

Partnerships were forged with Young-Shin Junior High School, Young-Shin Girls' Junior High School, Nakyang Junior High School, Nakyang Technical High School.

Preparation for takeoff 1956–1979
1960 saw the 4.19 Revolution, where the CAU students educated under the motto of "Truth and Justice" protested against the March 1960 Rigged Elections. Furthermore, despite the many challenges faced with the control policy affecting student-intake for the alleged qualitative improvement of universities, which was introduced in the wake of the 5.16 Military Coup in 1961, CAU was able to appoint Dr. Sung-Hee Yim as its second chancellor on 2 October 1961. Later Yim was re-appointed as the third chancellor, she was able to continue ensuring the internal stability of the university.

In January 1965, the College of Liberal Arts & Science was segregated into the College of Liberal Arts, College of Science & Engineering and College of Education, whilst the College of Law, College of Business, and College of Pharmacy were combined to form six colleges. Furthermore, the partnered Middle School and High School were renamed in affiliation with the College of Education, and an affiliate Elementary School was newly established under the Foundation, allowing the delivery of a coherent educational philosophy from kindergarten to graduate school.

In February 1967, the Graduate School of Social Development was established to train specialists and promote industrial links. In 1968, the university was again reorganised into the eight component faculties, including College of Liberal Art, College of Science & Engineering, College of Education, College of Law, College of Political Science & Economics, College of Business Administration, College of Agriculture, and College of Pharmacy, for the systemization of education impacting the affiliate organisations.
The College of Medicine was installed in December 1971, and Sung Shim Hospital, based in Jung-gu, Seoul, was incorporated as an affiliate hospital.

July 1961 saw the construction of Jin Sun Hall across approximately 1,400 pyeong, and the University Theatre across 1,920 pyeong. In October of the same year, the Social Development Hall was constructed across 1,600 pyeong. The Archives were reorganised to mark the 50th anniversary in 1968. The Blue Dragon Monument was erected to safe-guard artefacts and documents for the next 100 years, and Seungdang Hall built. Bobst Hall, covering 3,200 pyeong, was built the following year, December 1969. The Sung Shim Hospital of 1,395 pyeong was affiliated.

By this time, the founder of CAU, Yim was over 70 years old and finding the workload physically gruelling. Thus, she charged Dr. Chull Soon Yim to succeed her as the fourth chancellor of CAU.

The College of Liberal Arts and College of Science & Engineering were restructured into the College of Liberal Arts & Science and College of Engineering in 1972. In the field of art, CAU merged with Seorabol Art College, which was operated by the Seorabol Art Institute, in June 1972, and further reorganised the establishment under the College of Arts in 1974. Two affiliate schools were constructed in 1978, and the Graduate School of International Management and Graduate School of Education installed in January 1979.

Jin Sun Hall was extended in October 1972 for construction of 3,100 pyeong of Seorabol Hall, and 2,400 pyeong devoted to the construction of Natural Hall as part of the College of Medicine in 1974. The Students' Union Building was constructed in December 1976 over 2,000 pyeong, and in June 1978, a new annex provided over 1,450 pyeong for the affiliate Sung Shim Hospital, based in Pil-dong, Jung-gu, Seoul.

In February 1977 Yim, the founder of CAU, died.

In March 1980, lecture halls, dormitories and a Students' Union were built across 2,417 pyeong, 1,706 pyeong, and 597 pyeong of land respectively in Anseong-si, Gyeonggi-do, to create the Anseong Campus.

Adversity after expansion 1980–1986

Following the end of his term as chancellor, Dr. Chull Soon Yim was succeeded by the professor of philosophy, Dr. Suk-Hee Lee, as the fifth chancellor in May 1980.

The Graduate School of Journalism was established in November 1980 to train professional journalists, and Heukseok-dong equipped with education facilities accordingly. In December, a 0.9-acre annex was built for the affiliate hospital to improve the education environment for the College of Medicine.

Improvements to facilities happened at the Seoul and the Anseong campuses.

In October 1981, faculties in Anseong were reorganised under the College of Foreign Languages, College of Social Science, and College of Home Economics. Seoul and Anseong sites were listed as the university's primary and secondary campus, respectively. The Department of Music was segregated from the College of Arts and newly established as the College of Music in October 1981. The College of Agriculture was reorganised as the College of Industrial Science. The Graduate School of Construction Engineering was added to the roster of faculties in September 1983. After the establishment of the College of Construction Engineering in the secondary campus in Ansung in October 1984, the secondary campus had seven colleges.

In November 1982, the Professor Research Center was built over 636 pyeong, and 626 pyeong was spared for the College of Agriculture experiment area. In December, the building for the College of Arts was built over 4,874 pyeong. Continuing the investments, 1,192 pyeong for the Music College lecture area, 714 pyeong for the assembly area, and 423 pyeong for the swimming pool was established in August 1983. In September, the Gymnasium was finished over 655 pyeong. In December 1984, the 1,145 pyeong building was erected for the College of Music; finally, 5,068 pyeong was given for the third faculty residence. By the end, the campus had a modern look.

Dr. Byoung Jip Moon succeeded to Dr. Suk Hee Lee as the sixth president in March 1985. Moon began to reorganize the management operating system. The Office of Career Planning was established. The management of the Chung-Ang Cultural Institute and the Medical Center were modified. The departments of French Language & Literature and Japanese Language & Literature were reinstalled, and the Department of Industrial Information created. The construction of a Central Library in the second campus was promoted.

Realization of vision 2008
Dr. Bum Hoon Park was inaugurated as the 12th university president in February 2005. As his first assignment upon election, he oversaw the evaluation of the Korean Council for University Education, marketing of capital, BK21, establishment of the Professional Graduate School of Law, and other national enterprises.

Restructuring of the Education Science Technology Faculty, which had been the greatest pending issue, was so successful it was nominated a leading university and awarded grant maintenance (KRW 9,100,000,000) comparable to that of major competitor universities, in spite of its 1-year probationary period.

Following the restructuring of the undergraduate programmes, recruiting of new admissions, registration of current students, financial situation and overall management records of the three professional schools and 11 specialised schools, were analysed to identify the areas for improvement and enhance teaching quality. Thus, 32 out of 42 staff from the professional schools and specialized schools were reassigned to the general graduate school, and 10 positions reduced. The members reassigned to the general graduate school have been resourced to serve as the primary models in forming the Research Priority Group (Staff), for the construction of a research-centred regime.

DRAGON 2018 (2001–2004), which was the development plan devised under the 11th university president to carry the university towards the university target vision by the Centenary Anniversary, was re-branded as CAU2018+ (2005–2008). CAU2018+ lists the valuation index for various industries and the source of expected revenue in detail. To accomplish the goals, CAU2018+ was implemented in two stages.

For the first four years of Dr. Bum Hoon Park's term in office, resources were heavily invested in education/research equipment. Thus, the nation's largest Law Hall was constructed in February 2007, and a master plan drawn up for the construction of the Pharmacy and Natural Science R&D Centers around the Main Entrance in Campus 1, and an Engineering R&D Center by the Gymnasium,

In 2008, the Media Practice Section was established in the Law Hall and 400 additional wards were added in the affiliate hospital. Accordingly, the Chung-Ang Site Construction Plan, included in the CAU2018+ Development Plan was set in motion.

In November 2007, authorisation was obtained from Hannam-si, for developing a tertiary, Hannam Campus. Camp Colbern, which was previously a US Army installation of 86,000 pyeong will be renovated for the purpose. A team will be banded per subject field to oversee the management.

244 full-time teaching staff were recruited between 2005 and 2009, and in the first semester of 2009, 25 full-time and part-time staff were recruited.

Law and Medical Schools were established in March 2009.

KRW 40 billion of development funds, KRW 166.3 billion of external research grant, and KRW 17.3 billion in government aid allocated as a government-funded enterprise have been secured over the 4 years since Dr. Bum Hoon Park's inauguration into office. The sum of KRW 223.6 billion is the largest amount secured financially in the history of the university.

In May 2008, a global corporation, Doosan Group, was incorporated as an educational institution, and Yong-Sung Park was elected as the ninth chairman of the board.

The appointment of Chairman Park, who negotiated the industry-shift of Doosan Group from consumer goods to heavy industry, symbolises the rebirth of the university. Within 80 days of taking office, a meeting was held with the teaching staff on 27 August 2008, where the CAU2018+ Mid-Term Development Plans were announced along with the new strategy direction of "Choice and Concentrate, Strengthening of Executive Ability, Establishment of Virtuous Cycle Structure".

The Degree Management System has been strengthened to encourage students to study diligently, as in order to graduate, students have been made to attain a minimum level in compulsory subjects such as English and Accounting.

In order to the support this type of research, education and practice more effectively, an R&D Center for the College of Pharmacy and new Dormitories for students were constructed, the Central Library renovated, and the hospital extended to fit 300 additional wards.

Research projects are also being supported by the Special Committee for Strengthening the Research Marketability.

Such changes have already resulted in the designation of six new companies in the second stages of the BK21 enterprise, and a budget of KRW 6 billion being allocated to the leading research team, thus implementing the "choice and concentrate" strategy.

The direct election system for presidency was abolished and replaced by the appointment system. Consequently, the 12th president, Dr. Bum Hee Park, was re-appointed into office as the consecutive 13th president.

The largest project being persevered by Dr. Bum Hee Park and the corporation, is the establishment of Hannam Campus. In 2007, a memorandum of understanding was exchanged with Hannam, and thus preparation for the creation of Hannam Campus are currently underway.

As of February 2009, Chung-Ang University, as a comprehensive institution, has produced one general graduate school, five professional graduate schools, 11 specialised graduate schools, 18 modularised colleges in the campuses across Seoul and Anseong, and issued a total of 147,196 Bachelor's degrees, 29,940 Master's degrees, and 4,275 Doctorates.

In March 2014 Chung-Ang University began accepting video game players into their Department of Sport Science.

Academics

Colleges and schools
The existing faculty-based system has been replaced by a functional vice president system in 2014 and each college is operated by the dean of each college. As of 2014, there are 12 colleges and 49 departments.

Postgraduate programs
The postgraduate programmes in Chung-Ang University are categorised into General Graduate School, Professional Schools and Specialised Graduate Schools.

International student
The international student population in Chung-Ang University reaches approximately 2,000. Approximately 200 exchange students are admitted into Chung-Ang University per year.

Admissions
The admissions ratio at Chung-Ang University is 7.45% based on 2014 statistics. (73,021 applicants for 5,443 places)

Rankings
Chung-Ang University (CAU) ranked third in the category of social sciences and fifth in education among Korean universities in the 2020 Times Higher Education (THE) University Rankings.

According to the 2019 Korea University Rankings by JoongAng Ilbo, CAU ranked first in the fields of film, drama and theatre studies.

Campus

Seoul campus
Libraries: Chung-Ang University is home to the Central Library and Law Library.
 Renovation work to the Central Library was completed in August 2009, thereby stretching the site to fit 3,400 personal cubicles, study rooms, tutoring rooms, an E-Lounge, and CAU-Garden, as well as providing access to electronics newspapers, notice boards and memo boards, over a 14,258.2 m2 (4,320 pyeong) site. The library houses over a million books and articles, 2,500 publications, 80,000 electronic journals, 120 web data, all dissertations published by the university graduates, 27,000 original data, and 40,000 copies of E-books fit for service.
 The Law Library is on the first and second floors of the Law Building and houses volumes, reference books, periodicals and all domestic and foreign data.

Main Administration Building: The university headquarters can be seen upon passing the Middle Entrance. This white building is where the offices of the President, Student Affairs, General Affairs and Public Relations Department can be found.

Emancipation Square, in the center of the university, is sheltered by Seorabol Hall, the Central Library and the Student Union Hall. The area is enjoyed by students seeking relaxation, and also during festivities.

The Blue Dragon Monument and Blue Dragon Pond, near the Middle Entrance, were installed in 1968 to commemorate the university's 50th anniversary. The Blue Dragon Monument depicts the moment of ascension from its embrace of the Earth, with the blessing of seven miniature dragons, and is symbolic of the prosperity of Chung-Ang University.

Student Union Hall & Student Cultural Hall. The Student Union Hall is inhabited by student societies and eateries, including the cafeteria, "Seulkimaru", and CAU Burger, stationery shops, travel agents and women's restrooms amongst others. The Student Cultural Hall is home to the student newspaper, UBS Broadcasting Network, and Chung-Ang Culture.

Young-Shin Hall, situated by the Main Entrance, was completed in May 1938. During the oppressive time in Korean history when Japanese colonialists prohibited the collecting of financial aid, donations had to be amassed from the U.S. As a result, the Pfeiffer Foundation was born.

College Buildings include the College of Law (Law Building), Seorabol Hall, Bobst Hall, Pfeiffer Hall, College of Natural Science (Natural Science Building), College of Medicine (Medical Building), College of Pharmacy (Pharmacy Building), and the Institute of Performing Arts.

The College of Law Building, constructed in 2007, is shared by the School of Business Administration, College of Education and the College of Law. Facilities include student cafeterias and staff cafeterias, computer rooms, the Law Library, assembly hall and postgraduate rooms.

Blue Mir Hall was constructed in August 2010. It can accommodate 955 students and has been equipped with restaurants, convenience stores, sports facilities and cafes.

Seorabol Hall is an eight-story building across from the College of Law, home to the College of Liberal Arts and College of Education.

Bobst Hall: As the first of two Engineering Buildings, the space is mainly used by Mechanical Engineering, Electrical and Electronics Engineering and Chemical Engineering students. The building is behind the Student Cultural Hall and is furnished with labs and research space.

Engineering Building 2 supplements the first Engineering Building. The space is mainly used by students of Computer Science and Engineering and Architectural Engineering, working in the computer labs and design labs.

Natural Science Building is constructed of distinctive red bricks and is inhabited by the Department of Physics, Chemistry, Life Science and Math Statistics.

Medical Building is spread over two sites near the Student Union Hall and the Central Library consisting of Medical Building 1 and Medical Building 2.

Pfeiffer Hall and R&D Center: The College of Pharmacy is in Pfeiffer Hall, which boasts an array of laboratories.

Art Center building, also known as the Media & Performance Theatre, is stage to the School of Mass Communication and School of Drama and Film Studies. University functions and performances are held in its halls.

Gymnasium is located by the back entrance together with the Professor Research Center. The grounds are host to the Career Fair each term.

Anseong campus
The Anseong Campus is located in Daedeok-myeon, Anseong-si, Gyeonggi-do. The secondary campus was established in 1979, subsequent to the recognition of Chung-Ang as a university in 1948.

College of Arts Precinct consists of four buildings, including the Modelling Hall, Theatre, Crafts Hall, and Sculpture Hall. The College of Arts is an art institute that teaches ten genres from literature, sculpture and performance to visual and design. The lectures are open to students in Creative Writing, Korean Painting, Western Painting, Arts & Crafts, Photography, Dance, Sculpture, and Industrial Design,

School of Music Precinct has three buildings in the School of Music Precinct: Music Building 1, Music Building 2, and a third named Young-Shin Music Hall. The School of Music is mainly frequented by students of Composition, Voice, Piano and Orchestral Instruments.

-The Korean Traditional Music Building is a stroll down the path lying between the Music Buildings and the Young-Shin Music Hall, towards the Water Surface Stage. All areas of the Korean Music Building are open to the public. The theatre and lobby are on the second floor in a gallery formation, whilst private practice rooms are available to students on the third floor.

Lakeside Theatre is a stage erected at the side of a lake, serving as an open-air arena for summer performances. The surrounding garden is equipped with trees and benches.

College of Biotechnology & Natural Resources Precinct has five buildings in the Biotechnology & Natural Resources Precinct: Circular building (Won hyung gwan), Biotechnology building 1, Biotechnology building 2, Biotechnology building 3 and a Living Modified Organisms Laboratory. The College of Biotechnology & Natural Resources is an important institution that leads biotechnology and research to Chung-ang University.

Student life

Clubs

Traditions
 LUCAUs (Let's Unite CAUs) is a student festival that is held every summer.
 Undergraduate Department-held 'Jujom (lit.: bar)' party.

Healthcare System
Chung-Ang University Healthcare System provides healthcare to the residents in the Seoul Metropolitan Area, running two hospitals, each located in Seoul and Gwangmyeong. 
Founded in 1968 as the first domestic association of medical school professors, Chung-Ang University Hospital established its foundation for a new takeoff by moving from Pil-dong to Heukseok-dong in 2004. In 2011, Yongsan Hospital finished its 27-year-old history and relocated to merge with the Chung-Ang University Hospital. CAUHS opened its fourth hospital, Chung-Ang University Gwangmyeong Hospital in March 2022.

Notable alumni

Politicians
 Auh June-sun (어준선)
 Chang Je-won (장제원)
 Jung Choun-sook (정춘숙)
 Kim Nam-kuk (김남국)
 Koo Yun-cheol (구윤철)
 Kweon Seong-dong (권성동)
 Lee Baek-yun (이백윤)
 Lee Jae-myung (이재명)
 Noh Woong-rae (노웅래)

Musicians

Film industry

Sports

Miscellaneous

Reference materials
 2 Years since the affiliation with Doosan Inc, CAU at the center of university revolution. 'Ongoing transformation', 'Changing atmosphere'.
 2 Years since the affiliation with Doosan Inc, CAU at the center of university revolution. 'Can-do spirit'
 2 years of Doosan involvement – Ranking of CAU changes significantly.
 Seoul National Univ loses 5 <BK(Brain Korea) 21> projects, CAU gains 6.

CAU 2018+
CAU 2018 builds on the accomplishments of Dragon 2018 and outlines the improved development plans for Chung-Ang University as achievable short-term targets, with the ultimate aim to be listed within 100 of internationally renowned universities by 2018, commemorating Chung-Ang University's Centennial Year. The implementation will be segmented into the Chung-Ang Person Cultivation Plan, Chung-Ang Team Formation Plan and the Chung-Ang Site Construction Plan, for education, research and environment respectively.

See also
 List of colleges and universities in South Korea
 Education in South Korea

References

External links
 Official website
 Official English website

 
Universities and colleges in Seoul
Universities and colleges in Gyeonggi Province
Private universities and colleges in South Korea
Dongjak District